Nepalis in Saudi Arabia are immigrants from Nepal to the Kingdom of Saudi Arabia, mostly migrant workers and expatriates. Saudi Arabia has emerged as one of the top destinations for migrant Nepalese laborers. Approximately 300,000 Nepalese laborers, skilled and semi-skilled, work in the country of which mostly belongs to Madhesi Race totalling up to 199,757 according to IOM Report of 2012-2014 and remaining are predominantly belong to Bahun and Chhetri ethnicity.

Labor issues
According to Human Rights Watch, the kafala system in Saudi Arabia has subjected thousands of migrant workers to be abused by their employers in ways such as non-payment of wages, forced confinement in workplace, confiscation of passports, excessive work hours with little rest, physical and sexual abuse, and forced labor including trafficking. Nepalese embassy officials in Saudi Arabia said about 70,000 to 80,000 Nepalis in the country are trapped under critical working conditions.

References

Ethnic groups in Saudi Arabia
Saudi Arabia
Saudi Arabia